

Top 10 grossing Hollywood movies 

Note: This list is incomplete and does not include Tagalog movies and some of the box office figures for Hollywood movies released from January and February 2015 have NO DATA on Box Office Mojo and The Numbers.

References

2015
Phil
Numb